Thalassogena is a genus of fungi in the family Halosphaeriaceae. This is a monotypic genus, containing the single species Thalassogena sphaerica.

References

External links
Thalassogena at Index Fungorum

Microascales
Monotypic Sordariomycetes genera